The 1996 American West Conference men's basketball tournament was held March 10–11, 1996, in Cedar City, Utah at the Centrum Center. The champion of this conference did not receive a bid to the NCAA tournament.

|- 
| colspan=6 style="text-align:left;" |

Bracket

References

American West